Aidan McMullan (born 16 March 1997) is a Canadian professional rugby union player. He plays as a wing for the Austin Elite in Major League Rugby.

References

1997 births
Living people
Austin Gilgronis players
Canadian expatriate rugby union players
Canadian expatriate sportspeople in the United States
Expatriate rugby union players in the United States
People from Pointe-Claire
Rugby union wings